Samuel Butcher may refer to:
Samuel Butcher (Royal Navy officer) (1770–1849), British naval officer
Samuel Butcher (bishop) (1811–1876), his son, Bishop of Meath, 1866–1876
Samuel Butcher (classicist) (1850–1910), his son, Anglo-Irish classical scholar and politician
Sam Butcher (born 1939), artist